Gymnocalycium robustum is a species of Gymnocalycium from northern Córdoba and southern Santiago del Estero, Argentina.

References

External links
 
 

robustum
Flora of Argentina
Plants described in 2002